Hang Seng China H-Financials Index (H-FIN) is one of the Hong Kong stock market indexes produced by the Hang Seng Indexes Company Limited. H-FIN was launched on 27 November 2006. It is used to reflect the performance of all China financial stocks listed in Hong Kong.

Feature
Key features of H-FIN include the following:

 Stocks in this index are selected on the Hang Seng Industry Classification System
 Shows performance of China financial industry, which has a high weighting in H share stocks
 Stocks are freefloat-adjusted for investibility representation
 A 10% cap is applied in calculation to avoid single stock domination

Key information
Launch date  : 27 Nov 2006 
Backdated to : 5 Mar 2004
Base date    : 5 Mar 2004
Base index   : 5,033.14
Review       : Half-yearly
Dissemination: Every 2 sec
Currency     : HKD
No. of Constituents : 47

See also
 Hang Seng Index

References

External links
Official website

Hong Kong stock market indices
Hang Seng Bank stock market indices